Sanford Augustus Brookins (1877–1968), also known as Sanford Augustus Brookings, was an American architect, builder, and businessperson. In the early 20th-century, he was one of two African-American architect-builders in Jacksonville, Florida. He was instrumental in the formation of a few key neighborhoods including Sugar Hill, Durkee Gardens, and Riverside within Jacksonville; and the seaside community of American Beach.

Biography  
Sanford Augustus Brookins was born on May 9, 1877 in Macon, Georgia. He attended the Dorchester Academy in Liberty County, Georgia. 

In 1904, Brookins moved to Jacksonville, Florida eventually settling in the Sugar Hill neighborhood. He worked as a construction foreman for twelve years, before starting his own residential construction business in 1916. Brookins primarily designed and built houses in the Sugar Hill neighborhood; the newer neighborhood of Durkee Gardens; and Riverside, a historically white neighborhood. He is also credited with designing two beach cottages at American Beach, an early oceanfront resort developed specifically for African Americans in Florida. By 1925, he had designed and built more than 150 residential buildings. 

He retired in 1965, and had moved to Compton, California. Brookins died June 22, 1968 in Compton.

Works 

 Brookins residence, 601 West 8th Street (1924), Sugar Hill, Jacksonville, Florida
 2336 Gilmore Street (1925), Riverside, Jacksonville, Florida
 2152 Herschel Street (1925), Riverside, Jacksonville, Florida
 5485 Waldron Street (1936), Jacksonville, Florida
 1187 West 10th Street (1940), Jacksonville, Florida
 1197 Durkee Drive North (1941), Jacksonville, Florida
 1125 West 8th Avenue (1944), Jacksonville, Florida
 1189 Durkee Drive North (1945), Jacksonville, Florida
 5475 Gregg Street (1949), American Beach, Florida; part of the NRHP-listed historic district
 Brookins cottage, 5485 Waldon Street, American Beach, Florida

See also 
 African-American architects

References 

1877 births
1968 deaths
African-American architects
African-American investors
African-American history of Florida
People from Macon, Georgia
People from Jacksonville, Florida
People from Compton, California